Dosina is a genus of marine bivalve molluscs, in the family Veneridae.

Species
As of October 2021, the following species are accepted  in the genus Dosina:
Dosina firmocosta 
Dosina mactracea 
Dosina marwicki 
Dosina morgani 
Dosina occidentalis 
Dosina suboblonga 
Dosina uttleyi

References

 Powell A. W. B., New Zealand Mollusca, William Collins Publishers Ltd, Auckland, New Zealand 1979 

Veneridae
Bivalve genera